William Rankin Dill (born August 18, 1930) is an American academic administrator who served as the president of Babson College from 1981 to 1989. He graduated from Bates College in Lewiston, Maine and the Carnegie Institute of Technology. Born in Sewickley, Pennsylvania he became a faculty member Carnegie-Mellon University in Pittsburgh from 1955 to 1965.

See also 
 List of Bates College people

References 

Bates College alumni